Hidden Timber is an unincorporated community in Todd County, in the U.S. state of South Dakota.

History
A post office called Hidden Timber was established in 1926, and remained in operation until 1962. The community was named for a secluded tract of forest near the original town site.

References

Unincorporated communities in Todd County, South Dakota
Unincorporated communities in South Dakota